George Smythe may refer to:

George Smythe, 7th Viscount Strangford (1818–1857), British politician
George Chichester Smythe (1843–1902), Irish Anglican priest
George W. Smythe (1899–1969), American general in the Battle of Jackson Heights

See also
George Smyth (disambiguation)